Tircan (also, Tirdzhan) is a village and municipality in the Ismailli Rayon of Azerbaijan, a nation bordered by Iran, Russia, Georgia, and Armenia.  It has a population of 1,375.

References 

Populated places in Ismayilli District